The Children's Museum may refer to:

Taiwan
 Children's Art Museum in Taipei

United States
 The Children's Museum, Connecticut, in West Hartford
 The Children's Museum of Indianapolis, Indiana
 Boston Children's Museum, Massachusetts
 Brooklyn Children's Museum, New York
 Children's Museum of Utica, New York
 The Children's Museum (Pennsylvania), in Bloomsburg
 Seattle Children's Museum, Washington

Venezuela
 Children's Museum of Caracas

See also 
 Children's museums